Center Stage is the state theater of Maryland, and Baltimore's largest professional producing theater.

Center Stage began in a converted gymnasium in 1963 as a full arena theatre that seated 240 people. Today, Center Stage houses two performing spaces, the 541-seat Pearlstone and the smaller Head Theater, both in its home in the Mount Vernon Cultural District of Baltimore.

History
Launched in 1963 by a group of local theater supporters, Center Stage soon became a leader in America's regional theater movement, with the goal of producing first-rate professional theater for local audiences, along with theaters such as The Guthrie Theater in Minneapolis, Arena Stage in Washington, DC, and Alley Theatre in Houston. In 1931 the North Avenue building was previously occupied by a theatre called The Peabody that opened in the early 1900s; in 1931 Orioles Cafeteria a local food chain restaurant moved into the space at 11 East North Avenue and moved out in August 1965 to make space for the Center Stage theater.

On January 10, 1974, the theater's North Avenue home was burned to the ground in an arson fire (reported to have been started by two men who accidentally set the Center Stage ablaze at the back after mistaking it for the next-door bar, Benny Goodmans Beef And Beer, from which they had been forcibly removed and were out to burn down in an act of revenge). After the 1974 fire, many decided that since the outer shell was not severely damaged, some hope remained for salvage use, but the interior was completely destroyed and unstable, was considered unsafe by city inspectors and construction crews and was later demolished. Although the majority of the building was demolished, both sides of the facade columns remain to remind passersby of what was once there. The site of the North Avenue building is currently a small parking lot for used cars and auto repairing. Additional stage hands quickly rebuilt the set for Edward Albee's Who's Afraid of Virginia Woolf for its performance the next night at the Baltimore Museum of Art and with help from local civic leaders the theater continued its season at the local College of Notre Dame (once a part of Loyola High School and College) and used the disaster to launch a major public relations and capital campaign to keep the organization alive.

The theater ultimately moved into a new space carved out of an abandoned Jesuit college. The Center Stage has since become Baltimore's leading professional theater, hosting more than 100,000 people each season to its home in Mount Vernon.

In 2011, British playwright Kwame Kwei-Armah succeeded Irene Lewis as artistic director of Center Stage. Center Stage audiences became familiar with him in 2005 when Kwei-Armah's most recognized work Elmina's Kitchen held its American premiere at Center Stage. The play had previously debuted at the National Theatre in London in 2003, making Kwei-Armah the first Black Briton to have a play produced on the West End. 

The 2018/19 Season welcomed Artistic Director Stephanie Ybarra, an artistic producer most recently at The Public Theater. Center Stage has transitioned from a six-play to a seven-play season that includes a mix of comedy, drama, and musicals.

Main stage performances occur in either the 541-seat Pearlstone Theater or the smaller, flexible-layout Head Theater. The Play Lab series features new work from emerging and established artists. Third Spaces brings theater to unexpected stages, such as the 2013 production of The Container, which placed a small audience inside a shipping container, and Fourth Spaces explores the relationship between technology and artistry, using the Center Stage interactive media wall to connect audiences and theater artists.

See also

Theater in Maryland

References

External links
 Center Stage website

League of Resident Theatres
Midtown, Baltimore
Theatres in Baltimore
Tourist attractions in Baltimore
1963 establishments in Maryland
Mount Vernon, Baltimore
Arts organizations established in 1963